Chito M. Jaime (born October 21, 1983) is a Filipino professional basketball player who last played for the Zamboanga Family's Brand Sardines of the Maharlika Pilipinas Basketball League. He also previously played in the Philippine Basketball Association (PBA).

Player profile
Jaime combines strength and power with athleticism, and a nose for the ball. He also has a smooth stroke from long range. A good fast break finisher and back court defender, Jaime is extremely competitive and plays hard offensively and defensively. During his college tenure with the AMA Titans, he averaged a near 20-10 (points and rebounds), and is probably the best local player among his batch that did not came from either the UAAP or the NCAA.

He was drafted 14th overall by Sta. Lucia in the 2008 PBA draft and later played for Kia Picanto of the Philippine Basketball Association (PBA).

Jaime debuted at the Maharlika Pilipinas Basketball League with the Muntinlupa Cagers in February 2018.

PBA career statistics

Correct as of September 24, 2016

Season-by-season averages
 
|-
| align=left | 
| align=left | Sta. Lucia
| 15 ||	4.3 || .353 || .250 || .400 || .5 ||	.1 ||	.0 ||	.0 ||	1.1
|-
| align=left | 
| align=left | Sta. Lucia
| 8 ||	6.1 || .294 || .000 || .833 || .9 ||	.0 ||	.1 ||	.0 ||	1.9
|-
| align=left | 
| align=left | Rain or Shine
| 13 ||	6.1 || .364 || .250 || .667 || 1.1 ||	.5 ||	.2 ||	.0 ||	1.5
|-
| align=left | 
| align=left | Rain or Shine
| 16 ||	7.1 || .128 || .087 || .500 || 1.4 ||	.3 ||	.3 ||	.0 ||	1.1
|-
| align=left | 
| align=left | Air21
| 18 ||	7.1 || .343 || .167 || .714 || 1.6 ||	.2 ||	.1 ||	.0 ||	2.1
|-
| align=left | 
| align=left | Kia
| 4 ||	13.5 || .400 || .222 || .250 || 2.8 ||	.8 ||	.3 ||	.0 ||	5.8
|-
| align=left | 
| align=left | Mahindra
| 23 ||	10.2 || .340 || .302 || .522 || 2.4 ||	.2 ||	.2 ||	.0 ||	3.9
|-class=sortbottom
| align=center colspan=2 | Career
| 97 || 7.4 || .307 || .213 || .571 || 1.5 ||	.2 ||	.2 ||	.0 ||	2.2

References 

Living people
1983 births
Filipino men's basketball players
Basketball players from Bataan
People from Balanga, Bataan
Power forwards (basketball)
Sta. Lucia Realtors players
Rain or Shine Elasto Painters players
Air21 Express players
Terrafirma Dyip players
Maharlika Pilipinas Basketball League players
Sta. Lucia Realtors draft picks
Zamboanga Valientes players